Lineage may refer to:

Science 

 Lineage (anthropology), a group that can demonstrate its common descent from an apical ancestor or a direct line of descent from an ancestor
 Lineage (evolution), a temporal sequence of individuals, populations or species which represents a continuous line of descent
 Lineage (genetic)
 Lineage markers
 Data lineage

Gaming 

 Lineage (series), a medieval fantasy massively multiplayer online role-playing game franchise
 Lineage (video game), the original 1998 game
 Lineage II, a 2003 prequel to Lineage
 Lineage III, an upcoming sequel to Lineage II
 Lineage W, 3D mobile version of Lineage aiming for global service
 Assassin's Creed: Lineage, a series of short films based on the Assassin's Creed II video game

Television 

 "Lineage" (Angel), a 2003 episode of the television series Angel
 "Lineage" (Smallville), a 2002 episode of television series Smallville
 "Lineage" (Star Trek: Voyager), a 2001 episode of the television series Star Trek: Voyager
 "Lineage", a 2012 episode of the television series Revenge (season 2)

Other fields 

 Embraer Lineage, business jet
 Lineage (Buddhism), line of transmission of Buddhist teachers
 Zen lineage charts, lines of transmission of Zen teachers
 Line of transmission of martial arts teachers and/or founders
 LineageOS, an open-source operating system